Paul Serge Forest is a Canadian writer from Quebec, whose debut novel Tout est ori won the Prix Robert-Cliche and was shortlisted for the Governor General's Award for French-language fiction at the 2021 Governor General's Awards.

A medical doctor by profession, Forest grew up in Quebec's Côte-Nord region.

Tout est ori was selected for the 2022 edition of Le Combat des livres, where it will be defended by actress Charlotte Aubin.

References

21st-century Canadian novelists
21st-century Canadian male writers
Canadian male novelists
Canadian novelists in French
French Quebecers
People from Côte-Nord
Writers from Quebec
Living people
Year of birth missing (living people)